Nocardioides mesophilus is a mesophilic, rod-shaped, and motile bacterium from the genus Nocardioides which has been isolated from soil from Bigeum Island, Korea.

References

Further reading

External links
Type strain of Nocardioides mesophilus at BacDive -  the Bacterial Diversity Metadatabase	

mesophilus
Bacteria described in 2010